The Old Jewish Cemetery in Frysztak, Poland, was established probably in the 17th century and not later than 1860s, and is located at present-day Parkowa Street south of the town square.

Around thirty matzevahs and the remnants of the old cemetery wall remain until the present-day. The grave of Esther Etel Elbaum (d. 1800), daughter of Rebbe Elimelech of Lizhensk, surrounded by a metal fence is especially noteworthy.

Gallery

Bibliography

Notes

External links 
 The Old Jewish Cemetery in Frysztak on the Polish Virtual Sztetl site
 Description of the cemetery with illustrations (pl.)

Jewish cemeteries in Poland
Holocaust locations in Poland
Religious buildings and structures in Frysztak